James Donaldson (born 14 September 1991) is an English professional rugby league footballer who plays as a  and  for the Leeds Rhinos (Heritage № 1442) in the Betfred Super League. 

Donaldson, a Challenge Cup winner, previously played for the Bradford Bulls in the Super League, and on loan from Bradford at the Dewsbury Rams in the Kingstone Press Championship. He played for Hull Kingston Rovers in the Super League and the Championship, and on loan from Hull KR at the York City Knights in Betfred League 1.

Background
Donaldson was born in Whitehaven, Cumbria, England.

Donaldson subsequently attended Whitehaven School.

Playing career

Early career
He played a key role in the 2007 Rugby League European under-16's Championships, where Whitehaven School represented England.

Donaldson was much sought after as a junior and signed for the Bradford Bulls, despite offers from many other top clubs.

A , Donaldson hails from Cumbria and he has played for the famous Wath Brow Hornets amateur side.

Senior career

Bradford Bulls
Donaldson played for the Bradford Bulls between 2009 and 2014.

Statistics

Dewsbury Rams
Donaldson appeared for the Dewsbury Rams in the 2013 rugby league season, as part of the Bradford Bulls' dual-registration partnership with the club.

Statistics

Hull Kingston Rovers
Donaldson joined Hull Kingston Rovers ahead of the 2015 Super League season.

He represented the club in the 2015 Challenge Cup Final.

Donaldson suffered relegation from the Super League with Hull Kingston Rovers in the 2016 season, due to losing the Million Pound Game by the Salford Red Devils.

In the Good Friday Championship league clash against the Featherstone Rovers on 14 April 2017, Donaldson unfortunately suffered a season-ending anterior cruciate ligament (ACL) knee injury in Hull Kingston Rovers' 30–22 victory at Craven Park.

Donaldson (currently injured at the time), was part of the Hull Kingston Rovers' side that won promotion back to the Super League, at the first time of asking following relegation the season prior, securing automatic promotion through the 2017 Qualifiers process.

Donaldson made his long-awaited return from his ACL kneeinjury on 15 March 2018, in a Super League fixture against the Huddersfield Giants, Hull Kingston Rovers ran-out 6–38 victors, with James featuring from off the interchange bench.

It was revealed on 10 October 2018, that Donaldson would be departing Hull Kingston Rovers following a restructure of the club's on field personnel.

Statistics

York City Knights
Donaldson appeared on only one occasion for the York City Knights on 11 March 2018, four-days later he made his long-awaited return to the Hull Kingston Rovers' fold, following his long-term ACL knee injury that he sustained the season prior.

Donaldson scored for the York City Knights on a single dual-registration appearance, in a 22–24 victory over Oldham.

Statistics

Leeds Rhinos
It was revealed on 6 December 2018, that Donaldson had been handed a trial at the Leeds Rhinos ahead of the 2019 campaign.

Donaldson was subsequently given a chance to "prove his worth" to new Leeds Rhinos Head Coach David Furner, in all hopes of earning a contract at the club on a permanent basis.

On 8 January 2019, after a successful trial, Donaldson signed a one-year contract with the Leeds Rhinos.

Donaldson made his Leeds Rhinos' début on 2 February 2019, in a 26–6 round 1 Super League defeat against the Warrington Wolves at the Halliwell Jones Stadium.

Donaldson scored his first try for the Leeds Rhinos on 19 April 2019, in a 38–18 victory over the Huddersfield Giants.

It was announced on 12 September. Donaldson would be staying at Leeds until 2021.

On 17 October 2020, he played in the 2020 Challenge Cup Final victory for Leeds over Salford at Wembley Stadium.
On 24 September 2022, Donaldson played for Leeds in their 24–12 loss to St Helens RFC in the 2022 Super League Grand Final.

Statistics

References

External links

Leeds Rhinos profile
Hull KR profile
Bradford Bulls profile
SL profile
SL Stats profile

1991 births
Living people
Bradford Bulls players
Dewsbury Rams players
English rugby league players
Hull Kingston Rovers players
Leeds Rhinos players
Rugby league second-rows
Rugby league locks
Rugby league players from Whitehaven
York City Knights players